The Mongolian lark (Melanocorypha mongolica) is a species of lark in the family Alaudidae found from southern Russia and Mongolia to central China.
The Mongolian Lark is known for its elaborate singing and even well into adulthood, is able to learn new songs. While female Mongolian Larks don’t sing, they have noteworthy song control nuclei with strong connectivity. Male Mongolian Larks have large song bouts and song phrases that allow them to have extremely large song control nuclei.

Taxonomy and systematics
The black lark was originally placed in the genus Alauda. Alternate names for the black lark include Mongolian sand-lark and Mongolian skylark.

References

Mongolian lark
Birds of Mongolia
Birds of North China
Mongolian lark
Taxonomy articles created by Polbot